Hilario is the debut full-length album from Canadian indie rock duo The Inbreds, released in 1992 on PF Records. The album compiles songs from the band's early demo cassettes Darn Foul Dog, Let's Get Together, Egrog, and the split 7-inch single "Shermans/Inbreds," as well as some unreleased material. The album was a hit on Canadian campus radio stations.

Critical reception
Trouser Press wrote: "Although it’s clear the two had the architecture of their simple sound down from the very beginning, it took their songwriting a few months to shed a weakness for conceptual gimmickry ('Granpa’s Heater,' 'T.S. Eliot') and find a reliable perch from which to fly." Billboard called it "charming" but "spotty."

Track listing

Personnel
Mike O'Neill - bass, vocals
Dave Ullrich - drums

References

The Inbreds albums
1992 albums